Mercedes Rosalba Aráoz Fernández (born 5 August 1961) is a Peruvian economist, professor, and politician who served as Second Vice President of Peru from 2016 to 2020. At the beginning of her political career, she served as Minister of Foreign Trade and Tourism from 2006 to July 2009, after which she was appointed briefly as Minister of Production, and finally as Minister of Economy and Finance, all portfolios under the second presidency of Alan García.

At the 2016 Peruvian general election, Aráoz ran for the Second Vice Presidency along with Pedro Pablo Kuczynski and Martin Vizcarra in the Peruvians for Change ticket, being ultimately elected in a tight run-off against Keiko Fujimori's Popular Force ticket. Simultaneously, she was elected to Congress for the 2016–2021 term. In the Kuczynski administration, she was appointed Prime Minister of Peru, serving from 17 September 2017 to 2 April 2018. Kuczynski resigned on 23 March 2018, following a corruption scandal, thus making Martín Vizcarra the new President of Peru; Araóz subsequently acted as the only Vice President in the Vizcarra administration.

On 30 September 2019, a dispute between Martín Vizcarra and Congress resulted in the dissolution of Congress by the President, which in turn suspended Vizcarra and named Aráoz as Acting President. During the 2019–2020 Peruvian constitutional crisis, the suspension of Vizcarra was generally not recognized, forcing Aráoz to decline the claim to the presidency on 1 October 2019. Her resignation was accepted by Congress on 7 May 2020, leaving both Vice Presidencies vacant.

Early life and education 
Aráoz was born in Lima and attended St. Mary's School in Magdalena del Mar, Lima. 

She then attended University of the Pacific in Lima, where she studied economics, and later obtained a Master's degree in economics and PhD in economics from the University of Miami School of Business at the University of Miami in Coral Gables, Florida in the United States.

Aráoz completed specialization courses in foreign trade policies at Harvard Kennedy School and at the Latin American Network of Commercial Policy in Buenos Aires. She also studied Coaching at Newfield Network, Santiago de Chile.

Alan García administration (2006–2010)

Foreign Trade and Tourism (2006–2009) 

On 28 July 2006, Aráoz was named as Minister of Foreign Trade and Tourism. During her tenure, she fostered free trade negotiations with the European Union, EFTA, China, Canada, Chile, Mexico, and Japan, among others.

Production (2009) 
On 11 July 2009, Aráoz was named as Minister of Production after leaving the Foreign Trade and Tourism portfolio.

Economy and Finance (2009–2010) 
In December 2009, Aráoz was named as Minister of Economy and Finance. She was the first woman in Peruvian history to hold this office.

During her nine months of managing the Ministry, priority was given to the promotion of infrastructure and public services investment projects; likewise, the concessions of construction projects at national level were reviewed. During her term, the government maintained the growth of the Peruvian economy despite the global financial crisis.

2011 Peruvian Aprista Party presidential nomination
In November 2010, congressman Mauricio Mulder proposed Aráoz for presidential nomination for American Popular Revolutionary Alliance (APRA) in the 2011 general election. In spite of her resignation as Finance Minister, she was propelled by the government to run for the nomination. She won the majority in at the party's national convention, and accepted the nomination on 28 November 2010. Despite criticism for selecting an independent pro-market liberal as the social democrat party's nominee, her run was viewed by analysts as an intent of propelling the party for future Alan García run in 2016, despite low chances of victory in 2011. As running mates, the party selected former prime minister and congressman Javier Velásquez (1st) and former cabinet minister and congresswoman Nidia Vílchez (2nd).

Throughout the internal process, however, Aráoz held many disagreements with high-ranking party leaders, such as former prime minister Jorge Del Castillo, who was ultimately selected as the head of the congressional list for the Lima constituency. Aráoz heavily criticized the decision of including among the congressional candidates Del Castillo, based on the corruption allegations imputed against him. This event would finally lead to her nomination withdrawal on 16 January 2011. The party would not field any candidate for the election, and Aráoz would retire momentarily from politics.

Congresswoman and Vice president 
In the 2016 general election, Aráoz ran with the Peruvians for Change party as candidate both for Congress and for Second Vice President as running mate of Pedro Pablo Kuczynski. She remains an independent within the Party. The ticket was successful and Aráoz was elected Second Vice President

Vice presidency 
In August 2016, Aráoz was appointed as chair of the APEC Peru 2016 High-Level Commission.  The commission was made to determine necessary guidelines, strategies and measures to guarantee Peru's success as host of the meeting.

In August 2017, Aráoz was named as Commissioner for Peru-OECD adherence process.

Prime Minister of Peru 
In September 2017, Aráoz was sworn in as President of the Council of Ministers (Prime Minister). She held the office until April 2018.

Academic career 
She is Principal Professor of International Economy at the University of the Pacific and member of the Research Center. She is also professor at the Diplomatic Academy of Peru.

She has worked as a consultant with a variety of international organizations including the World Bank, the United Nations Conference on Trade and Development (UNCTAD), the Organization of American States (OAS) and the CAF – Development Bank of Latin America.

Aráoz served as Country Representative for the Inter-American Development Bank (IADB) in Mexico City from 2011 until 2015.

Explanatory notes

References 

|-

|-

1961 births
21st-century Peruvian women politicians
21st-century Peruvian politicians
Living people
Politicians from Lima
Peruvian Ministers of Economy and Finance
Peruvian Ministers of Foreign Commerce and Tourism
Peruvian people of Basque descent
Peruvian people of Spanish descent
Peruvians for Change politicians
Prime Ministers of Peru
University of Miami Business School alumni
University of the Pacific (Peru) alumni
Vice presidents of Peru
Female finance ministers
Women government ministers of Peru
Women prime ministers
Women vice presidents